Jam 1980's is the 46th studio album by American musician James Brown. The album was released in March 1978, by Polydor Records and arranged by James Brown with Sweet Charles Sherrell arranging "Nature".

Track listing

References

1978 albums
James Brown albums
Albums produced by James Brown
Polydor Records albums